Golden Team may refer to:

 Golden generation or golden team, an exceptionally gifted group of players of similar age
 Golden Team, the Hungary national football team of the 1950s.
 Romanian Golden Team, a group of former Romanian gymnasts founded in 2006.
 CCA Golden Team